Long Lane may be:

 Long Lane, Gdańsk, Poland
 Long Lane, City of London, England
 Long Lane, Southwark, London, England
 Long Lane, Shropshire, England
 The Long Lane (Derbyshire), England, a Roman road
 Long Lane, Leicestershire, England, a historical name for the area of Coalville
 Long Lane, Missouri, U.S.

See also 
 Longlane (disambiguation)